FIVEaa (pronounced Five Double A) is Adelaide's only commercial talkback radio station. 
The station has a range of programs including news, sports, current affairs, social issues, football calls, gardening, lifestyle, cars, travel and health. It is owned by Nova Entertainment.

History
5AA commenced service in Kent Town on 14 March 1976 on the frequency 1390 AM. It was moved to 1386 AM with the introduction of 9 kHz spacing on the AM dial in 1978. The station now broadcasts on 1395 AM.

5AA commenced its life with a "Beautiful Music" format and quickly became Adelaide's number-1-rated radio station. In 1976, the only FM competition was ABC Classic FM. AM stations were ABC Radio, 5DN and music stations 5KA and 5AD.

In the 1980s, 5AA was sold to the State Government-owned TAB betting agency, ditching music to begin broadcasting horse and dog racing, with talkback in between race calls. The station shifted to the TAB headquarters in Pulteney Court, Adelaide, with "Talk of the Town" as its slogan. However, it plummeted in popularity as a result of its schizophrenic broadcasting policy. With the advent of narrowcast licences, the TAB purchased frequency 1539AM and shifted all racing there, freeing up 5AA for talk and interviews.

A new slogan was adopted in the early 1990s; "5AA, Where you don't miss a thing" and the station began a slow rise in the ratings to challenge ABC Radio and 5DN.

On 27 September 1996, 5AA was separated from the TAB and sold by the Government of South Australia as part of its asset sales program to repay state debt, 5 years after the $3 billion collapse of the State Bank. The new owner was dmg Radio Australia, with CEO Paul Thompson, which had national headquarters in Adelaide.

In 2000, another new logo was adopted with the slogan "Interactive Radio FIVEaa".

In October 2004, the station shifted to new premises in Hindmarsh Square alongside Nova 919, also owned by DMG Radio Australia, which had launched two months earlier.

In November 2009 dmg (now NOVA Entertainment) sold 50% of the station to Lachlan Murdoch's company Illyria, and Paul Thompson became non-executive chairman for six months. When Nova itself was acquired by Illyria in September 2012, it became the sole owner of the station.

References

External links 
Official website
Death of Brian Bennett - Adelaide Now

Nova Entertainment
Daily Mail and General Trust
Radio stations in Adelaide
News and talk radio stations in Australia
Radio stations established in 1976
1976 establishments in Australia